Robert McIntosh Isaacs (26 September 1815 – 26 March 1876) was an Australian politician.

Robert M. Isaacs was born at Tortola in the British Virgin Islands, the son of Robert Glover Isaacs and Ann (née Frett). He was educated in England and called to the bar in 1839. On 27 July 1841 he married Barberina Rogers Harrison, with whom he had six children. 

From about 1846 Isaacs practiced as a barrister on the island of Antigua in the West Indies, during which time he was a member of the Legislature.  For a period he filled the role of acting Chief Justice and for several years was Chancellor to the Bishop.  Isaacs and his family left the West Indies at the end of 1854 for England.  In October 1855 Isaacs and his family sailed from Liverpool for Australia aboard the clipper ship Schomberg on her maiden voyage, which was wrecked near Cape Otway on 27 December 1855.  Isaacs, his wife and children were removed from the wreck and shortly afterwards came to Sydney. 

A member of the New South Wales Legislative Council from 1857 to 1861, he refused appointment as Attorney-general. His period as member of the Upper House was "characterised by rather extreme views".

In 1865 he was elected to the New South Wales Legislative Assembly for Yass Plains, serving until his retirement in 1869.  Isaacs was appointed as Solicitor-General in the second government of James Martin in 22 January 1866, and continued in that role until 26 October 1868. In 1871 he moved to Hobart to serve as chancellor of the Anglican archdiocese of Hobart, returning to Sydney in 1872 where he became Crown Prosecutor for the western districts. A conservative politically, he described himself as a Tory. 

Isaacs died at his residence in Darlinghurst on 26 March 1876.

References

  

1814 births
1876 deaths
Members of the New South Wales Legislative Assembly
Members of the New South Wales Legislative Council
Solicitors General for New South Wales
19th-century Australian politicians